George Armstrong Custer (1839–1876) was an American Civil War general and Indian fighter.

Custer may also refer to:

Places
Custer, Idaho
Custer, Kentucky
Custer, Michigan
Custer, Missouri
Custer, Montana
Custer, South Dakota
Custer, Washington
Custer, Wisconsin
Custer Airport, Monroe, Michigan
Custer City, Oklahoma
Custer National Cemetery, at Little Bighorn Battlefield National Monument in Montana
Custer National Forest, Montana and South Dakota
Custer State Park, South Dakota

People with the name
Custer (surname)
Custer LaRue, soprano

Arts, entertainment, and media
"Custer" (song), a 2014 song by Slipknot from .5: The Gray Chapter
Custer (TV series) a 1967 TV series starring Wayne Maunder

See also
Custer County (disambiguation)
Custer Township (disambiguation)